Norway competed at the 2019 World Athletics Championships in Doha, Qatar, from 27 September to 6 October 2019.

Results 
The Norwegian Athletics Association named the first athletes of the team on 12 September 2019. 17 athletes (12 men and five women) competed in 17 events.

Men
Track and road events

Field events

Combined events – Decathlon

Women
Track and road events

Field events

References

Nations at the 2019 World Athletics Championships
World Championships in Athletics
Norway at the World Championships in Athletics